Pavlo Sergeyevich Yanchuk (born 12 July 1986) is a Ukrainian former professional footballer who played as a defender.

Career 
Yanchuk started playing football in the Dynamo Kyiv Youth Academy. He then left for the Ukrainian First League club Obolon Kyiv from where he was bought by the Romanian side, FC Argeş Piteşti. During the 2008 winter transfer season, Yanchuk signed a half-season deal with FC St Pauli after unsuccessfully trying out in Schalke 04, he left then in July 2008 Hamburg. Afterwards he played for Romanian side Liberty Salonta.

References

External links
 
 
 
 
 

1986 births
Living people
Ukrainian footballers
Association football defenders
Liga II players
2. Bundesliga players
Nemzeti Bajnokság I players
FC Dynamo Kyiv players
FC Obolon-Brovar Kyiv players
FC Tiraspol players
FC St. Pauli players
FC Argeș Pitești players
CF Liberty Oradea players
Budapest Honvéd FC players
FC Bihor Oradea players
Ukrainian expatriate footballers
Ukrainian expatriate sportspeople in Romania
Expatriate footballers in Romania
Ukrainian expatriate sportspeople in Germany
Expatriate footballers in Germany
Ukrainian expatriate sportspeople in Hungary
Expatriate footballers in Hungary
Ukrainian expatriate sportspeople in Moldova
Expatriate footballers in Moldova
Footballers from Kyiv